Dr. Dale W. Meyerrose, Major General (Retired)  was the first President-appointed, Senate-confirmed Associate Director of National Intelligence/Intelligence Community Chief Information Officer (CIO) and Information Sharing Executive for the Director of National Intelligence (DNI).

Dr. Meyerrose is president of the MeyerRose Group, LLC, a company that consults with a wide range of business, government, and academic organizations on strategy, business planning, technology, education, and executive development issues.  He is a visiting associate professor at the School of Information Studies, Syracuse University.  He is an adjunct professor at Carnegie Mellon University's School of Computer of Science with the Institute for Software Research and director for the Cybersecurity Leadership (CSL) certificate program.  Additionally, Dr. Meyerrose is a Trustee and Treasurer for the U.S. Air Force Academy Falcon Foundation.  He was formerly the president and chairman of the board for the Air Force Historical Foundation, and advisor to the U.S. Air Force Heritage Program.

Dr. Meyerrose was recently a vice president and general manager for Harris Corporation, a Global Fortune 500 company.  He was responsible for leading all aspects of strategy, business development and program execution for cyber growth initiatives across the corporation—and participated in multiple merger and acquisition activities.

In 2018, Dr. Meyerrose became president and chairman of the board for Imcon International, Inc. and joined the Board of Directors of ThinkRF.

Government career 
Dr. Meyerrose was the first President-appointed, Senate-confirmed Associate Director of National Intelligence/Intelligence Community Chief Information Officer (CIO) and Information Sharing Executive for the Director of National Intelligence (DNI).  He managed activities relating to the information technology infrastructure and enterprise requirements of the U.S. Intelligence Community.  He had the procurement approval authority over all information technology items related to the enterprise architectures of all Intelligence Community components.  He directed and managed all information technology-related procurement for the Intelligence Community and ensured that all expenditures for information technology and research and development activities were consistent with government enterprise architectures.  He also led the information sharing strategy and policy for the Intelligence Community.  This position was created by the 2004 Intelligence Reform and Terrorism Protection Act.

Dr. Meyerrose initiated an effort to test and ultimately use blogs as a tool for intelligence gathering. While the blogosphere is well known amongst Internet users, it was new terrain for the secure information culture of the intelligence community. Recognizing the trappings of large scale initiatives, Dr. Meyerrose pursued "thinking big, starting small, and scaling fast" through the use of Web 2.0 technology. He fostered the development of Intellipedia and pilot projects such as a U.S. government-wide focused on avian flu, in which participants numbered in the tens-of-thousands in just a few months. Information sharing contributions were made worldwide, and content and quality grew rapidly, becoming the impetus for information sharing across the U.S. government.

Military career 
While on military active duty, Major General Dale W. Meyerrose served as chief information officer of three major U.S. Air Force Commands and three unified U.S. military combatant commands. He was the director of Command Control Systems for the North American Aerospace Defense Command during 9/11, helping to safeguard the air sovereignty of North America. He subsequently became the first chief information officer for U.S. Northern Command, the first modern U.S. military command responsible for homeland defense. General Meyerrose served as the director of communications for coalition task forces supporting post-DESERT STORM operations in Southwest Asia and subsequent combat operations in the Balkan Peninsula.

In his last military assignment, General Meyerrose was the Director of Command Control Systems, Headquarters North American Aerospace Defense Command, and Director of Architectures and Integration, Headquarters U.S. Northern Command, Peterson Air Force Base, Colorado. He also served as the Chief Information Officer and Air Force Element Commander for Air Force personnel for both commands. General Meyerrose ensured the availability and performance of the command and control systems to safeguard the air sovereignty of North America. He facilitated communications and information sharing for military assistance to civil authorities for incident response responsibilities assigned to Northern Command.

Born in Indianapolis, Indiana, General Meyerrose entered the Air Force in 1975 after graduating from the United States Air Force Academy. The general wears the master communications badge and is a master parachutist.

Education

Military Assignments 
July 1975 - February 1976, distinguished graduate, Communications-Electronics Officer Course, Keesler Air Force Base, Mississippi
February 1976 - April 1977, maintenance officer, 4th Combat Communications Group, Altus Air Force Base, Oklahoma
May 1977 - June 1979, aide-de-camp, later, assistant executive officer to the Commander, European Communications Division, Kapaun Air Station, West Germany
June 1979 - June 1980, aide-de-camp to the Commander, Air Force Communications Command, Scott Air Force Base, Illinois
June 1980 - February 1982, Chief of Maintenance, 1974th Communications Group, Scott Air Force Base, Illinois
March 1982 - March 1983, member and Air Staff Training Program officer, Secretary of the Air Force Personnel Council, Washington, D.C.
March 1983 - May 1985, Chief, Long-Haul Information Systems, later, point of contact, Command, Control and Communications Systems Panel, Headquarters U.S. Air Force, Washington, D.C.
June 1985 - July 1987, Commander, 2048th Communications Squadron, Carswell Air Force Base, Texas
July 1987 - June 1990, Communications Support Officer, National Military Command Center, the Joint Staff, Washington, D.C.
June 1990 - July 1991, Chief, Future Concepts, Deputy Chief of Staff for Command, Control, Communications and Computers, Headquarters U.S. Air Force, Washington, D.C.
August 1991 - June 1992, student, National War College, Fort Lesley J. McNair, Washington, D.C.
July 1992 - June 1994, Commander, 3rd Combat Communications Group, Tinker Air Force Base, Oklahoma (February 1993 - May 1993, Director of Communications, Operation Southern Watch, Riyadh, Saudi Arabia)
July 1994 - December 1996, Director of Communications and Information and Chief Information Officer, Headquarters U.S. Air Forces in Europe, Ramstein Air Base, Germany
December 1996 - June 2000, Director of Communications and Information and Chief Information Officer, Headquarters Air Combat Command, Langley Air Force Base, Virginia
June 2000 - October 2002, Director of Command Control Systems and Chief Information Officer, Headquarters North American Aerospace Defense Command and U.S. Space Command, and Director of Communications and Information and Chief Information Officer, Headquarters Air Force Space Command, Peterson Air Force Base, Colorado
October 2002 - 2005, Director of Command Control Systems and Chief Information Officer, Headquarters North American Aerospace Defense Command, and Director of Architectures and Integration and Chief Information Officer, Headquarters U.S. Northern Command, Peterson Air Force Base, Colorado

Awards and decorations

Other achievements 
 1987 Outstanding Young AFCEAN Award, Armed Forces Communications and Electronics Association (AFCEA)
 1992 Medal of Merit, AFCEA
 1999 International AFCEAN of the Year, AFCEA
 2005 "Top 100" Information Technology Professionals, Federal Computer Weekly
 2007 "Premier 100", Computerworld
 2007 "Federal List of Top Ten Power Players in Washington, DC, Federal Computer Weekly
 2008 "North American Technology Leadership Award", Rocky Mountain AFCEA Chapter
 2008 "Lifetime Public Service Award", Association of Federal Information Resource Managers
 2008 "Outstanding Information technology Achievement in Government", Government Computer News
 2008 "Public Service Award for Excellence in Public Leadership", Executive CIO Top 10 Leaders and Innovators
 2008 "Lifetime Achievement Award", Air Force C4 Association
 2008 National Intelligence Superior Service Medal
 2008 National Geospatial-Intelligence Agency Medallion for Excellence
 2011 "Thought Leadership Award", EMC2
 2012 Air Force Communicators and Air Traffic Controllers Association Hall of Honor
 2012 U.S. Air Force Cyberspace Operations and Support Hall of Fame
 2014 Doctoral prize for Excellence in Scholarship and Research, School of Information Studies, Syracuse University
 2015 Federal News Radio, "Federal Executive Forum" Hall of Fame
 2020 AFCEA International Distinguished Life Member award

Effective dates of promotion

References

External links

United States Air Force Academy alumni
United States Air Force generals
People from Indianapolis
University of Utah alumni
Harvard Kennedy School alumni
Haas School of Business alumni
Recipients of the Air Force Distinguished Service Medal
Recipients of the Legion of Merit
United States Deputy Directors of National Intelligence
Living people
Recipients of the Defense Superior Service Medal
1953 births
Recipients of the Meritorious Service Medal (United States)